Renhold is a village and civil parish located on the River Ouse, in the Borough of Bedford, Bedfordshire, England. The parish church is situated some 4 miles (6.5 km) east-north-east of Bedford town centre. The former Bedfordshire County Council estimated the population of Renhold to be 1,800 in 2005, and forecast an increase to 2,320 by 2010.

The parish is made up of several hamlets ("Ends" in local parlance) including Salph End, Church End, Lane End, Top End, Workhouse End, and Water End. In the 2000s, two new housing estates were constructed on the southern boundary of Renhold parish. The Spires and Cranbourne Gardens estates have been established off Norse Road in Bedford, with vehicular access from the Goldington area of the town. The new estates remain part Renhold village for electoral purposes.

The parish is home to Renhold Chapel, All Saints Church at Church End, and the ruins of Renhold Castle. There is a country house called Howbury Hall in the southern part of the parish. It was rebuilt in 1849, and remains a private home.

Notable people 
 George Joyce (born c. 1492)- Publisher of the first English Primer (1529) and the first English translation of Psalms (1530)

Education 
Renhold village is primarily served by Renhold V.C. Primary School  and Mark Rutherford School to the south of the village. The Spires and Cranbourne Gardens estates fall into the catchment for both Putnoe Primary School and Renhold V.C. Primary School.

References

External links 

 Renhold Village Website
 
 Renhold Timeline
 Description of Renhold from 1866
 Renhold Chapel
 All Saints Church
 Renhold V.C. Primary School 
 The Polhill Arms Renhold

Villages in Bedfordshire
Civil parishes in Bedfordshire
Borough of Bedford